Soyuzneftegaz – international investment group of companies headquartered in Russia involved in oil and gas exploration and production, as well as construction. It is founded and headed by Yuri Shafranik, Chairman of the Board of the Union of Oil and Gas Producers of Russia. The Interstate Bank of CIS holds 30% and SNG Holding holds 70% of shares.

History
Soyuzneftegaz was established in 2000. In early 2003, Soyuzneftegaz signed a contract with the Iraqi authorities for developing the Rafidein oil field in southern Iraq, with the production of 100,000 barrels per day. Soyuzneftegaz received 25.5 million barrels (4.05 million cubic metres) in the Oil-for-Food Programme, which allowed Iraq to export oil to some companies and then to resell it in the United States, Europe, and Asia. Most of the funds were reserved for humanitarian needs or infrastructure work in Iraq. 

After the arrival of American troops in Iraq and a sharp deterioration of the situation in the country in 2004, Russian firms and specialists were withdrawn, and all work was practically terminated. In 2004, Soyuzneftegaz held negotiations with UK and US companies regarding the possible joint development of the Rafidein oil field in southern Iraq.

In 2004, Soyuzneftegaz gained control over UzPEC company, which since 2001 had a production-sharing agreement with Uzbekneftegaz for the Central Ustyurt and South-Western Gissar hydrocarbon deposits in Uzbekistan.  In 2007, Uzbekneftegaz conducted the production-sharing agreement for these fields with Soyuzneftegaz Vostok, a wholly owned subsidiary of Soyuzneftegaz.  In March 2008, Soyuzneftegaz Vostok was acquired by other Russian company Lukoil. The transaction cost was $580 million. 

In October 2004 Soyuzneftegaz won a tender in Syria for the onshore Blocks 12 and 14 near Iraqi border. In 2006, the company decided not to continue with the development of Block 14, but continued work on Block 12.  In 2005, Soyuzneftegaz acquired a 50% working interest in Block 26 in the northeast of Syria through its wholly owned subsidiary SNG Overseas.  On 25 December 2013, Soyuzneftegaz signed a 25-year agreement to prospect for more oil in Syria.  The company stopped its operations in Syria in 2015 because of the Syrian conflict.

In 2006, SNG Overseas was bought by the UK-based oil company Emerald Energy for exchange of US$7.3 million and 10% stake in Emerald Energy.  In August 2009, Soyuzneftegaz sold its shares in Emerald Energy to Chinese petrochemical company Sinochem. The total deal value was estimated at $878 million.

In 2013, Soyuzneftegaz agreed on a deal with Syria to jointly explore in the Mediterranean Sea, ostensibly for 25 years.

References

External links

 Official web site

Oil companies of Russia
Natural gas companies of Russia
Companies based in Moscow